Nordstrom Downtown Seattle, originally known as the Frederick & Nelson Department Store, is a department store in Seattle, Washington on Pine Street between Fifth and Sixth Avenues. It has been a flagship store for Nordstrom since 1998, and was originally the flagship store for Frederick & Nelson from 1918–1992. The building was designed by John Graham & Company in the Neo-Renaissance style. It was granted landmark designation by the Seattle Landmarks Preservation Board in October 1996.

References

External links 
 , Nordstrom website

Commercial buildings completed in 1918
Downtown Seattle
Tourist attractions in Seattle